The Arcadia Free Public Library is a Carnegie library serving Arcadia, Wisconsin. The city's library service was established in 1899 through a donation from State Senator Levi Withee and was originally based in the city hall. The Carnegie Foundation funded a library building for the city in 1905, and the library was built the following year. The building was designed by Diedrik A. Omeyer in the Classical Revival style. The library still serves the city; as it is located across the street from Arcadia's high school and elementary school, it has extensively served both schools throughout its history. On April 29, 1994, the library was added to the National Register of Historic Places.

References

External links
Arcadia Public Library website

Library buildings completed in 1906
Libraries on the National Register of Historic Places in Wisconsin
Neoclassical architecture in Wisconsin
Buildings and structures in Trempealeau County, Wisconsin
Carnegie libraries in Wisconsin
National Register of Historic Places in Trempealeau County, Wisconsin
1906 establishments in Wisconsin
Omeyer & Thori buildings